Mathieu Marie de Lesseps (12 October 1870 – 7 October 1953) was a French equestrian. He competed in the hacks and hunter combined event at the 1900 Summer Olympics.

References

External links

1870 births
1953 deaths
French male equestrians
Olympic equestrians of France
Equestrians at the 1900 Summer Olympics
Sportspeople from Paris